Hong Kyung-pyo (born August 11, 1962) is a South Korean cinematographer. He has worked with several acclaimed Korean directors, including Bong Joon-ho, Lee Chang-dong, and Na Hong-jin.

Zack Sharf praised him as one of 30 cinematographers to watch, praising his "dynamic camerawork". The director he has done the most work with, Bong Joon-ho, stated that any future Korean films he opted to do would use Hong as his cinematographer.

Filmography

Awards and nominations

References

External links 

 
 Hong Kyung-pyo

South Korean cinematographers
1962 births
Living people